Aaron is an unincorporated community in Bulloch County, in the U.S. state of Georgia.  It is located at an elevation of 266 feet.

History
A post office called Aaron was established in 1909, and remained in operation until 1920. The community was named after Aaron, a figure in the Hebrew Bible.

References

Unincorporated communities in Bulloch County, Georgia